The Southwestern Lacrosse Conference (SLC) is a lacrosse-only athletic conference affiliated with the Men's Collegiate Lacrosse Association (MCLA). The conference incorporates teams from California and Arizona and is divided into three divisions, Division I, Division II, and Division III.

History
The SLC is formed from original members of the Western Collegiate Lacrosse League which was the largest MCLA conference in the nation at the time.  Because of rapid growth and teams spread out over a very large area, the members decided it was best to start a new conference and the SLC was born August 2008 with the blessing of the WCLL and MCLA.

Currently, the SLC has 12 Division I teams and 10 Division II teams. The Division I and II teams are members of the MCLA and each divisional conference tournament winner receives an automatic bid to the MCLA National Tournament.

The 2023 season saw the introduction of a Division III component to the conference, comprised of community colleges and junior colleges.

Teams

Former members

Championship Records

Division I 

 Note: Bold text denotes MCLA National Champion
 Note: Italic text denotes MCLA National Champion runner-up

Division II 

 Note: Bold text denotes MCLA National Champion
 Note: Italic text denotes MCLA National Champion runner-up

References

External links
SLC website
Official MCLA website

College lacrosse leagues in the United States